Peperomia camptotricha is a species of plant in the family Piperaceae endemic to Mexico.

References

External links
 The Internet Peperomia Reference

camptotricha